Naili Abdullah Pasha (died August 1758) was an Ottoman Grand Vizier.

Naili Abdullah was a Turk from Constantinople and took a job in Ottoman bureaucracy. After several minor posts, he was appointed as the reis ül-küttab (chief of clerks, a post analogous to foreign minister in this period) in 1747, during the reign of Mahmud I. Eight years later, on May 19, 1755, during the reign of Osman III, he was appointed as the Grand Vizier, the highest post of the empire next to that of the sultan. However, Osman III was a weak sultan and was under the influence of Nişancı Ali Pasha, Naili Abdullah's rival. Naili Abdullah Pasha was dismissed by the sultan after only three months in the office on August 24, 1755. He was then appointed as the governor of Crete. Three years later, he was appointed the governor of Jeddah (in modern Saudi Arabia) upon his request. However, he died in Medina on his way to Jeddah in August 1758.

See also 
 List of Ottoman Grand Viziers

References 

18th-century Grand Viziers of the Ottoman Empire
Pashas
1758 deaths
Year of birth unknown
Reis ül-Küttab
Ottoman governors of Crete